Szilvia Szeitl (born 26 April 1987 in Budapest) is a Hungarian football defender currently playing in the Hungarian First Division for 1. FC Femina, with whom she has also played the Champions League. She is a member of the Hungarian national team.

References

External links
 

1987 births
Living people
Hungarian women's footballers
1. FC Femina players
Footballers from Budapest
Women's association football defenders
Hungary women's international footballers